San Miguel Airport may refer to:

San Miguel Field, in the Dominican Republic
Romeral San Miguel Airport, in Chile
San Miguel South Airport, in Bolivia
San Miguel Airport (Panama), in Panama
San Miguel Ranch Airport at Trementina Base in New Mexico